Coenipeta is a genus of moths in the family Erebidae.

Species
 Coenipeta bibitrix Hübner, 1823
 Coenipeta colliquens Hübner, 1818
 Coenipeta medina Guenée, 1852
 Coenipeta tanais (Cramer, 1775)

References
 Coenipeta at Markku Savela's Lepidoptera and Some Other Life Forms
 Natural History Museum Lepidoptera genus database

Omopterini
Noctuoidea genera